Island Assembly elections were held in Nevis on 12 December 2022 to elect five members of the Nevis Island Assembly. 

The result was a win for the Concerned Citizens' Movement (CCM), led by Mark Brantley, which won 3 of the 5 seats. The opposition Nevis Reformation Party (NRP) won 2 seats, gaining the parish of St James'.

Election results

By parish

References

Nevis
Nevis
Elections in Saint Kitts and Nevis